Hyde Glacier is a short glacier flowing east through the Edson Hills to join Union Glacier, in the Heritage Range, Antarctica. It was mapped by the United States Geological Survey from surveys and U.S. Navy air photos, 1961–66, and was named by the Advisory Committee on Antarctic Names for William H. Hyde, an ionospheric scientist at Little America V Station in 1958.

See also
 List of glaciers in the Antarctic
 Glaciology

References

 

Glaciers of Ellsworth Land